Tim Hronek (born 1 June 1995) is a German freestyle skier. He competed in the 2018 Winter Olympics. He is the younger brother of alpine skier Veronique Hronek.

References

External links

1995 births
Living people
Freestyle skiers at the 2018 Winter Olympics
German male freestyle skiers
Olympic freestyle skiers of Germany
People from Traunstein
Sportspeople from Upper Bavaria
21st-century German people